Maud Cotter (born 1954) is an Irish artist, active in installation art, drawing, sculpture and landscape art. She is a member of Aosdána, an Irish association of artists.

Early life
Cotter was born in Wexford in 1954.

Career
Cotter studied at the Crawford Municipal College of Art and Design in Cork (graduating in 1975). In 1989 she was a co-founder of the National Sculpture Factory, with Vivienne Roche, Eilis O'Connell ​and Danny McCarthy. A visit to Iceland in 1991 ignited an interest in sculpture. She was elected to Aosdána in 2000.

Cotter is chiefly known for her work in sculpture. Her work has been exhibited at the Irish Museum of Modern Art and Crawford Art Gallery and at the Hugh Lane Gallery. In 2022 she will exhibit at the Irish Arts Center in New York City and also at MOCA, Jascksonville, Florida USA.

Her early work used glass and steel. Since the early 1990s she has used metal, cardboard, industrial rubber and clear plastic, and other industrial materials, saying that these materials help her "explore issues of definitions and boundaries, containment and space." Her practice is represented by domobaal gallery in London.

Personal life
Cotter is married to Peter Foynes.

References

External links

Irish women sculptors
Aosdána members
People from Cork (city)
20th-century Irish sculptors
21st-century Irish sculptors
20th-century Irish women artists
21st-century Irish women artists
Living people
1954 births